Idiopathic head tremors (IHT) in dogs are characterized by involuntary lateral or vertical movement of the head. Idiopathic head tremors are ordinarily considered a benign disease characterized by uncontrollable head tremors of spontaneous initiation and cessation. These head tremors are considered idiopathic because the cause is not apparent, but nervous system disorders, seizures and head injuries may be significant contributors of idiopathic head tremors in dogs. Head tremors are usually not associated with any other symptoms, although some dogs have other signs of disease in addition to head tremors.

Overview 
Idiopathic head tremors are characterized by three movements: rotational, up and down, and side to side. They occur spontaneously and typically last for 1-3 minutes. There is often not a postictal stage that generally follows a seizure, because idiopathic head tremors are not considered seizure activity. Dogs are generally alert and responsive during an episode.

This condition is more common in dogs from six months to three years old, and some breeds are more susceptible than others, including Spanish Hounds, Chow Chows, Samoyed dogs, Dobermans, Labrador Retrievers, Dalmatians, pitbulls, and Bulldogs.

Cause 
The cause is idiopathic, or unknown. One commonly accepted theory is dyskinesia that originates in the basal ganglia of the brain, which is responsible for motor control. Other possible causes are low glucose and/or calcium levels in the blood, often experienced by lactating dogs. Hormonal fluctuations may be a factor as well, since idiopathic head tremors are often more pronounced during estrus.

Diagnosis 
The diagnosis of idiopathic head tremors in dogs is based on signalment and medical history. It is considered a diagnosis of exclusion, meaning other possible causes must be investigated and ruled out before diagnosing idiopathic head tremors. Differential diagnoses include primary neurologic diseases like cerebellar disorders, steroid-responsive tremor syndrome ("little white shaker syndrome"), and exposure to toxins. Endocrine/metabolic diseases like hepatic encephalopathy and infectious diseases like rabies and canine distemper must also be ruled out. The first step is a comprehensive physical examination, including obtaining vital signs, auscultation of the heart, and palpation of the head, neck, and limbs. Additional testing includes a bile acid test, eye exam, brain MRI, and cerebrospinal fluid (CSF) analysis. These tests will enable the veterinarian to rule out the cause as an eye or progressive central nervous system problem. Dogs with idiopathic head tremors have no other neurological abnormalities, and both MRI and cerebrospinal fluid analyses produce normal results.

Treatment 
There is no treatment available for idiopathic head tremors. Anticonvulsants have not been shown to have an effect on curbing the occurrence of head tremors. For dogs that are actively having an episode, distraction techniques may be helpful. Talking to the dog or offering food and treats are methods of distraction. 

Although there is no treatment, prognosis is considered to be good because idiopathic head tremors are benign and do not lead to long term disease or illness.

References 

Dog diseases